Río Tercero is a city located on the center of the country, It is located 96 km from Córdoba city, 35 km east of the city of Embalse, and 386 m above sea level. With a population of 46,421 people is the seventh biggest city in the province. (Cordoba)

It was founded by Modesto Acuña on 9th september of 1913.

Notable residents
Juan Fernandez, college basketball player with the Temple Owls
Gustavo Fernandez, father of Juan Fernandez and former professional basketball player
Pablo Prigioni, basketball player
Ivanna Madruga, tennis player that reached US Open semifinals (1980 and 1982) and Roland Garros semifinals (1980 and 1983)
Oscar Galindez, word class triathlete
Claudio Javier "Piojo" Lopez, soccer player
Jose Maria "Pechito" Lopez, race car driver
Marcelo Milanesio, basketball player

See also 

 Río Tercero explosion

References

External links 
 
 Web Site -> Municipalidad de Río Tercero

Populated places in Córdoba Province, Argentina
Cities in Argentina
Argentina
Córdoba Province, Argentina